The first season of Canadian Idol debuted on June 9, 2003.  Ryan Malcolm of Kingston, Ontario was the eventual winner.  On July 15, 2003, CTV and INSINC announced that broadband video of the program would be available over the Internet.

Auditions

Auditions were held in Toronto, Montreal, Vancouver, Ottawa, Calgary, Winnipeg, Halifax, and St. John's in the spring.

Semi-finals

Semifinal Group 1 (7 July 2003)

Notes
Candida Clauseri, Mikey Bustos and Billy Klippert advanced to the top 11 of the competition. The other 7 contestants were eliminated.
Andrew Leader returned for a second chance at the top 11 in the Wildcard Round.

Semifinal Group 2 (14 July 2003)

Notes
Tyler Hamilton, Jenny Gear and Richie Wilcox advanced to the top 11 of the competition. The other 7 contestants were eliminated.
Marc Devigne returned for a second chance at the top 11 in the Wildcard Round.

Semifinal Group 3 (21 July 2003)

Notes
Audrey de Montigny, Gary Beals and Karen Lee Batten advanced to the top 11 of the competition. The other 7 contestants were eliminated.
Tyler Done, Toya Alexis, Sharon van den Enden and Ryan Malcolm returned for a second chance at the top 11 in the Wildcard Round.

Wildcard (28 July 2003)

Notes
Toya Alexis and Ryan Malcolm received the most votes, and completed the top 11.

Finals
The Final 11 performed through various "theme" weeks. These weeks included the Canadian Hits week, and the Love Songs week. With each week, one contestant would be eliminated, until the winner was found.

Top 11 (4 August 2003)
Theme: Canadian Hits

Top 8 (11 August 2003)
Theme: Motown

Top 6 (18 August 2003)
Theme: Summertime Hits

Top 5 (25 August 2003)
Theme: Elton John

Top 4 (1 September 2003)
Theme: Love Songs

Top 3 (8 September 2003)
Theme: Judge's/Competitor's Choice

Top 2 (15 September 2003)

Elimination chart

Releases
(This list does not include pre-Idol releases)

'Canadian Idol: Greatest Moments'

Ryan Malcolm
"Something More" (Single, 2003)
Home (Album, 2003)
"Star of all the Planets" (Single, 2004)
"You Made this Fool Become a Man" (Single, 2004)
Urgency (Ryan's band Low Level Flight - Album, 2007)
"Change for Me" (Ryan's band Low Level Flight - Single, 2007)
"Say" (Ryan's band Low Level Flight - Single, 2007)
"Turnaround" (Ryan's band Low Level Flight - Single, 2008)
Through These Walls (Ryan's band Low Level Flight - Album, 2011)
"Cash Machine" (Ryan's band Low Level Flight - Single, 2011)
"Brooklyn Radio" (Ryan's band Low Level Flight - Single, 2011)

Gary Beals
Gary Beals (Album, 2004)
"Summer Nights" (Single, 2004)
"I've Changed" (Single, 2004)
"Not That Strong" (Single, 2004)
The Rebirth of... (Album, 2009)
"I Know You're Out There" (Single, 2009)
"Jump Off" (Single, 2009)
Bleed My Truth (Album, 2020)
"Me for Me" (Single, 2020)
"Blood Red Roses" (Single, 2020)

Billy Klippert
Billy Klippert (Album, 2004)
"Levon" (Single, 2004)
Naked & The Simple Truth (Album, 2006)
"Going Under" (Single, 2006)

Audrey De Montigny
"Même Les Anges" (Single, 2003)
Audrey (Album, 2004)
"Dis-Moi Pourquoi" (Single, 2004)
"Don't You Say Goodbye" (Single, 2004)
Si L'Amour Existe (Album, 2006)
"Prends-Moi Comme Je Suis" (Single, 2006)
"Jardin Oublié" (Single, 2006)
Take Me As I Am (Album, 2006)
"Here We Are" (Single, 2007)
"Take Me As I am" (Single, 2007)
"Dans Ma Camaro" (Single, 2009)
Un Seul Instant (Album, 2012)
"Aujourd'hui Tout Va Changer (Single, 2012)
"Les Anges Dans Nos Campagnes" (Single, 2012)
"De Toi Je Rêve" (Single, 2013)
"Le Mal" (Single, 2013)

Jenny Gear
"Tower of Song" (Single, 2003)
"She's Like the Shallow" (Single, 2003)
Jenny Gear and the Whiskey Kittens (Album, 2004)
"Murder in the SouthLands" (Single, 2004)
"Brave Percy" (Single, 2005)
"Win Win" (Single, 2005)
"Pale Slice of Moon" (Single, 2005)
"All You Gotta Do" (Single, 2006)

Toya Alexis
"Am I Loving?" (Single, 2004)
S.O.B. Story (Album, 2005)
"Toy Boy" (Single, 2005)
"Where Did Our Love Go" (Single, 2006)

Mikey Bustos
Love Me Again (EP, 2005)
"If It Feels Good Then We Should" (Single, 2008)
Memoirs of a Superhero (Album, 2008)
"All I Need is Me" (Single, 2009)

Karen Lee Batten
Every Moment... (Album, 2005)
"A Bitter End" (Single, 2005)
Cause A Scene (Album, 2014)
Under The Covers in Muscle Shoals (Album, 2018)
"Sweet Home Alabama" (Single, 2018)
"Too Strong" (Single, 2020)

Other Contestants
You Decide (Kelly-Ann Evans - Album)

References

See also

List of songs performed on Canadian Idol

2003 Canadian television seasons
1
2003 in Canadian music